The High Atlas Foundation (HAF) (Arabic: مؤسسة الأطلس الكبير; Tamazight: ⵜⴰⵎⵔⵙⵍⵜ ⵏ ⵡⴰⵟⵍⴰⵙ ⴰⵎⵇⵇⵔⴰⵏ) is a  nonprofit organization that promotes community-designed initiatives for sustainable agriculture, women’s and youth empowerment, education, health, and capacity-building in Morocco.  It is headquartered in Morocco.

Founded in 2000 by former Peace Corps volunteers, HAF an American and Moroccan team that works in partnership with government and non-government agencies.  HAF has held consultancy status with the United Nations Economic and Social Council since 2011.

History 
HAF was founded by Yossef Ben-Meir and other former Peace Corps volunteers in 2000. Ben-Meir serves as President and oversees an international Board of Directors. HAP began implementing projects in Morocco in 2003.

HAF requested and was granted project funds from the then-U.S. Ambassador to Morocco, Margaret D. Tutwiler, in 2003, to begin planting organic fruit trees as cash crops for disadvantaged local communities and to help stop soil erosion.  Tutwiler arranged the participation of the United States Agency for International Development (USAID) and other agriculture experts. The project was immediately funded, setting a precedent that granted the Ambassador a discretionary fund from which HAF benefited further in later years. By 2014, HAF had planted one million fruit-bearing trees for the benefit of local communities. IT also launched its “one billion tree campaign,” planting 10,000 trees in eight Moroccan provinces in a single day toward addressing rural poverty, deforestation and soil erosion. Toward that end, HAF also hosts an annual tree-planting event in Morocco on the third Thursday of January in observance of Dr. Martin Luther King, Jr. In 2016, the organization planted more than one million fruit seeds and saplings with 120 schools in 15 Moroccan provinces.

In 2008, HAF held a reception at the residence of the U.S. Ambassador in Rabat. Princess Lalla Meryem, sister of King Mohammed VI, was in attendance.  HAF announced three partnerships with Hassan II University, the High Commission of Waters and Forests, and the Office Cherifien des Phosphates (OCP).

In partnership with HAF, Hassan II University’s Faculty of Law, Economics, and Social Science (Mohammedia) created the Center for Community Consensus-Building and Sustainable Development. The Center teaches participatory community planning skills to not only students but also faculty, government specialists, elected officials, civil society workers, and citizens. HAF trains facilitators in the participatory approach to community development, facilitates design of priority local projects, and supports implementation of those projects in fruit tree agriculture, clean drinking water, women and youth enterprises, and technical and managerial workshops. University students have volunteered with HAF to help plant trees and bring clean drinking water to remote villages as a result of this partnership.

Since 2011, HAF has held special Consultative Status at the United Nations Economic and Social Council. Through this access, HAF has participated in shaping the U.N.’s Sustainable Development Goals and negotiations on climate change relevant to both development and the environment in Morocco.

In 2013, HAF was the SEED Africa award winner in sustainable agriculture for helping the Moroccan farmers certify and sell organic walnuts and almonds produced in the High Atlas Mountains. All profits after cost were reinvested into community projects promoting entrepreneurship and fruit and nut tree growth through training and instruction.

Also in 2013, HAF participated in the Sixth Session of the United Nations General Assembly Open Working Group on Sustainable Development Goals, outlining how these can be implemented and achieved with global partners while also highlighting the challenges of countries in similar situations.

A 2017-2018 HAF-sponsored assessment of crop biodiversity in Morocco uncovered the loss of local crop varieties and genotypes. In response to the immediate need to preserve local crops, their wild relatives, and wild medicinal plants, HAF worked toward the creation of a Seed Bank.

The number of nurseries and number of seeds planted, and tree saplings delivered and planted increased significantly in 2018 with four new nurseries through HAF’s partnership with Morocco’s High Commission of Water and Forests and Ecosia, a social business based in Berlin.

In partnership with the U.S. Department of State and the Rural Family Society, HAF supported the project Realizing Sustainable Agriculture through Methods for Irrigation and Agriculture (MIRRA) in Azraq, Jordan, from 2019 to 2020. This project provided an integrated sustainable packaged solution to the challenges faced by farmers there: depletion and salinization of groundwater, salinization of soil, climate change, increased desertification, wetland loss, and decreased production of livestock.

In 2019, HAF and the U.S. Embassy jointly hosted a three-day Alumni Leadership Seminar in Marrakech, Morocco. Seventy young Moroccans who had participated in exchange programs through the U.S. Department of State in 2017-2018 connected with civil society leaders, experts in entrepreneurship, American diplomats, and embassy officials. This was followed by Marrakech-based community-service projects and professional development programs.

A HAF representative attended the United Nations Youth Climate Summit in New York City, in September 2019, for young leaders driving climate change solutions. That same year, a partnership with the University of Central Florida (Orlando), The Hollings Center for International Dialogue (Washington DC), and HAF conducted field work in the High Atlas Mountains that revealed the role that civil society has in achieving the United Nations’ 17 Sustainable Development Goals (2015) for eliminating poverty, conserving forests, and addressing climate change. HAF’s has helped organize the indigenous Amazigh people into local collectives, cooperatives, and associations to achieve those goals, especially as it pertains to water and drought.

The December 2019 issue of Consumer Reports included HAF on its list of “Most Effective Charities” being rated among the most highly impactful.

HAF opened its twelfth tree nursery near Ouarzazate, Morocco, in 2020 as part of its House of Life project. The nursery will grow almond, walnut, cherry, fig, pomegranate, and carob, donating the majority of the early trees to 5,000 farming families and 2,000 public schools.

Programs

Agriculture 
HAF works with Moroccan communities to plant fruit trees of different varieties. Among these are certified organic walnuts and almonds from the High Atlas Mountains made available to European and U.S. buyers. After covering the farmers’ production costs, proceeds are reinvested in community projects through HAF. This facilitates entrepreneurship and training for cultivation of fruit and nut trees. The tree-planting projects also reduce chemical pesticide use through organic farming practices and capture hundreds of tons of carbon dioxide each year. HAF maintains eleven tree nurseries all over Morocco and dedicated the opening of its twelfth fruit tree nursery in November 2020 in Ouarzazate.

Women's empowerment 
Moroccan women participate in planning and implementing development projects through HAFs “Imagine” workshops for empowerment, blending self-discovery activities with building women’s cooperatives. This approach focuses on local people identifying their needs and designing projects that directly involve and benefit them, building their feelings of self-worth, and recognizing their right to achieve socio-economic growth. HAF-supported women’s cooperatives develop value-added products that fund schools and other services in their communities. Community ownership and empowerment training through HAF has created more stable local economies.

Research conducted in 2017 by HAF revealed that most women in rural areas of Morocco, such as Al-Haouz Province, were unaware of the rights granted to them in the Moudawana (the family code law ratified in 2004) while women from cities, such as Marrakech, are well aware of it. This can be attributed to lack of education and illiteracy, lack of information access, and cultural practices that keep women dependent on their husbands and families. In light of this, HAF integrated a Rights-Based Approach (RBA) into its women’s empowerment training, reasoning that awareness strengthens capacity.

Youth 
Unemployment for Moroccan youth is high. This is combined with political disillusionment and low political participation to create pessimism and a feeling among young people of being unable to freely express themselves. Affording more chances for youth engagement and feedback, “Safe Space” meetings allow youth a voice in identifying and implementing projects that directly impact their needs. HAF’s Oummat Salaam Initiative provides chances for mentorship and agricultural skills-building for unemployed youth and youth inmates. They receive the integration exercises needed to become effective volunteers and to participate in community development.

Water 
HAF raises funding for regional initiatives that deliver clean drinking water to remote villages in Morocco. This creates jobs as well as protecting the environment. Rural families in Morocco need water not just for drinking, cooking, and washing, but also for subsistence farming. This requires women and children to walk great distances several times a day for access to water, resulting in children missing school. HAF has coordinated the efforts of international programs and local suppliers to construct pipeline systems, solar-energy pumps, and water tanks where needed.

Capacity-building 
HAF facilitates capacity-building in Moroccan communities through participatory planning and the management of projects, associations, and natural resources. People in rural communities need to develop skills to enhance their empowerment and promote economic development. The capacity of a community to provide that training is limited, and access for women and girls is not equitable. The 2016 Global Gender Gap Report ranks Morocco in the lowest tier of countries making progress toward gender parity. Socio-cultural practices, religion, and rural isolation further restrict skills-building. HAF assists local communities to identify and implement priority projects by fostering capacity-building skills.  Villagers are involved in every single step. They are entrusted with the authority to make decisions and increasingly become agents of change.”

Culture 
The Morocco ideal of multiculturalism ties cultural protection to development, diversity, and reduced socio-economic divides. It is based on the idea of coexistence (“convivencia” from the Spanish) displayed in the harmony with which the Christians, Muslims, and Jews lived in the region of Andalusia during the Middle Ages. This is now represented by Morocco’s national identity of a shared history and culture among diverse groups, including Arabs and the indigenous Amazigh. To that end, HAF works with its partners and the Ministry of Culture, the Ministry of Interior, and Association Mimouna on cultural preservation projects, such as protecting Jewish cemeteries left behind by the Moroccan Jewish diaspora, community mapping in the Mellah of Marrakech, and reviving an abandoned French Catholic monastery. In Essaouira, HAF is working to restore a Franciscan church to preserve the role Christianity has played in Moroccan culture and to make it a place for public meetings and education.

Partners 
High Atlas Foundation (HAF) nurseries use land lent In kind from donors such as the Departments of Water and Forests, the Ministry of Youth and Sports, and the Moroccan Jewish community. This, as well as collaborations with international partners such as Ecosia, a Berlin-based social business, allows the organization to plant more than 1 million seeds each year.

The House of Life project was created in 2012 between HAF and HA3 (the High Atlas Agricultural and Artisanal social enterprise), endorsed by the Kingdom of Morocco and the Clinton Global Initiative (CGI). The farm-to-table process began with the loan of land next to Jewish burial sites at no cost in three Moroccan provinces in order to establish nurseries for organic trees and medicinal plants meant to benefit neighboring Muslim farming communities. The nurseries enable allow communities to transition away from subsistence farming, which keeps them trapped in poverty, and to develop the local and national economy. Local cooperatives secure fair-trade prices for organically-grown products.  Profits from national and international markets are reinvested in the communities’ future projects. The first locally-managed nursery established on such land was in the then-Marrakech-Essaouira (now Marrakech-Safi) region, adjacent to the seven-hundred-year-old tomb of Jewish saint Rabbi Raphael HaCohen. In 2015, Younes Al Bathaoui, then-Governor of Al Haouz province, attended a HAF ceremony to plant 30,000 seeds and saplings there and to set aside 30,000 additional two-year-old trees of olive, fig, lemon, and pomegranate for local farmers.

A tree-planting and distribution ceremony with the fruit trees from that nursery was held in January 2016 in Tomsloht Commune, Akrich (Al Haouz Province) on the fifteenth day of Shevat, or Tu B-Shevat (Jewish calendar). Various dignitaries were in attendance, including the Honorable Dwight Lamar Bush (then-U. S. Ambassador), as well as Akrich community members and those interested in preservation of the Toubkal National Park. The ceremony signaled a partnership with the Clinton Global Initiative (CGI) Commitment to Action tree-planting project, ending with an agreement to plant a million trees on the land bordering Jewish burial sites in the Azilal, Essaouira, and Ouarzazate provinces. The partnership benefits disadvantaged local Muslim farmers.

The main goal of House of Life is forming Muslim-Jewish collaboration in Morocco with agriculture as a bridge between development needs and cultural history. The Akrich nursery gives 2,000 farming families and 150 local schools a chance to end food insecurity. Jews and Muslims work together through active community participation.

The Moroccan government has encouraged such projects in an effort to promote the country’s Jewish heritage, especially to encourage the return of two million Moroccan Jews in the diaspora. An estimated several hundred Moroccan Jews make the yearly Hiloula, or pilgrimage, to the site. For the Muslim caretaker, the nursery provides a secure income and helps the village address their most basic needs and improve their standard of living.

In a partnership with the Ambassadors Fund for Cultural Preservation through the U.S. Embassy in Rabat, HAF and the Essaouira-Mogador Association were able to engage in a project to maintain and preserve Muslim, Jewish, and Christian cemeteries in Essaouira.

Another nursery growing almonds and olives was established in 2013 in the village of Ouaouizerth through the U.S. Department of Bureau of Oceans and International Environmental and Scientific Affairs (OES). It was dedicated to the memory of former Peace Corps volunteer and U.S. Ambassador to Libya, J. Christopher Stevens. HAF’s partner, Ecosia, provides continued financial support to the nursery. Other nurseries in the High Atlas grow carob, walnut, pomegranate, cherry, fig, argan, and date palm as well, depending on the growing conditions. For spreading the variety of seeds and trees around the nation, HAF has been called the “Johnny Appleseed of Morocco.”

A 2016 partnership agreement with the Ministry of National Education and Vocational Training fostered environmental education in schools and created nurseries for planting trees at those schools.

The U.S. Agency for International Development (USAID) Farmer-to-Farmer program supplies technical assistance to farmers and people in the area of agriculture in developing countries. American volunteers with the program have helped establish, expand, and maintain nurseries in HAF’s community-based initiatives. In conjunction with a USAID Farmer-to-Farmer volunteer, HAF established a nursery in the village of Tassa Ouirgane in 2017 through a grant from the United Nations Development Program (UNDP). This helped the village improve irrigation, control erosion, add a solar pump, and store water for growing olives, walnuts, peaches, and plums in the nursery.

Students at University Sidi Mohamed Ben Abdellah (USMBA) in Fez, Morocco, determined in 2018 that a law clinic was needed there for the increasing number of refugees and those seeking asylum. As of 2020, with the closures, restrictions, and limitations for migrants brought on by the COVID-19 pandemic, HAF began implementing this student-run Clinique Juridique de la Faculté de Droit (CJFD), which is funded by the United States Middle East Partnership Initiative (MEPI) of the U.S. State Department and the National Endowment for Democracy. The clinic provides free legal aid to migrants, promotes human rights, and assists with social integration. During the COVID-19 crisis, the clinic offered pro bono legal aid in particular to refugees, migrants, victims of human trafficking, women, and youth.

HAF worked with Siemens Gamesa Renewable Energy in the summer of 2020 to distribute food, hygiene products, and clothing to thousands of Moroccans impacted by COVID-19. In addition, they collaboratively distributed thousands of almond and walnut trees to 500 most vulnerable households for better income and diet.

The High Atlas Foundation has also established partnerships with the following organizations, corporations, agencies, and government bureaus: Association Mimouna, Crédit Agricole du Maroc Foundation, FRÉ Skincare, Empowerment Institute, INDH (National Initiative for Human Development), National Endowment for Democracy (NED), and PUR Project.

References 

2000 establishments in Morocco
501(c)(3) organizations
Organizations established in 2000
Organizations based in Morocco